English singer-songwriter Passenger has released thirteen studio albums and 17 singles. He is best known for his 2012 single "Let Her Go", which reached number one in Australia, Austria, Belgium, the Czech Republic, Denmark, Finland, Germany, Greece, Ireland, Israel, Italy, Luxembourg, Mexico, New Zealand, Norway, Sweden, Switzerland and The Netherlands; number 2 on the UK Singles Chart; and number 5 in the US on the Billboard Hot 100.

Rosenberg first performed in public when he was 16. He founded the band Passenger with Andrew Phillips in 2003 in Brighton and Hove. The five-person band's debut and only album, Wicked Man's Rest, was released in 2007. Rosenberg wrote the majority of the album's tracks, with the exception of "Four Horses", which was written by Phillips. The band broke up in 2009.

After the break-up of Passenger, Rosenberg kept the stage-name Passenger and took to busking for a solo music career. His debut solo album, Wide Eyes Blind Love, was released in November 2009. The follow-up album, Flight of the Crow, was recorded in Australia and saw him joined in the studio by various Australian independent musical talents including Lior, Kate Miller-Heidke, Boy & Bear, Josh Pyke and Katie Noonan. In addition, he produced a fans-only limited release, Divers and Submarines.

On his next album, recorded at Sydney's Linear Recording, Rosenberg was joined once again by a core Australian band that included Boy & Bear drummer Tim Hart, jazz bassist Cameron Undy, and keyboards player Stu Hunter, from Katie Noonan & The Captains. All the Little Lights was released in summer of 2012 in North America on Nettwerk Records.

On 26 March 2014 Passenger announced that his fifth studio album, Whispers, would be released on 9 June 2014. Talking to Digital Spy about the album, he said, "This is easily the most 'up' album I've ever made, it's quite cinematic. There are lots of big stories and big ideas. There are also some sombre moments about loneliness and death but hey, it wouldn't be a Passenger album without those." He released "Scare Away the Dark" and "Heart's on Fire" as the lead singles from the album on 14 April 2014.

Albums

Studio albums

Compilation albums

Singles

As lead artist

Promotional singles

Other charted songs

Music videos

External links 
 Passenger on Musicbrainz

References

Notes

Sources

Discographies of British artists